Garsdale is a dale or valley in the south east of Cumbria, England, historically a part of the West Riding of Yorkshire. It is now within the South Lakeland local government district, but is still a "Yorkshire Dale" for planning purposes. In the 2001 census the parish had a population of 202, decreasing at the 2011 census to 191.

Garsdale is on the western slopes of the Pennines, between Baugh Fell to the north, and Rise Hill to the south. It is within the Yorkshire Dales National Park.  The dale is the valley of the Clough River, which rises on the north eastern slopes of Baugh Fell and flows through Grisedale, the Dale that Died, as Grisedale Beck until it becomes the Clough River at Garsdale Head.

The dale forms the civil parish of Garsdale (though the last mile and a half of the course of the Clough river, before its confluence with the Rawthey, is part of the parish of Sedbergh). The other hamlet in Garsdale is Garsdale Head, also called Hawes Junction, the old name for Garsdale railway station, after the former Wensleydale branch on the Settle to Carlisle railway.

At Longstone Fell, locally known, and spoken as Langst'n Fell, the A684 road rises to a well-known view-point looking over the Howgill Fells, and the river descends to Danny Bridge, the site of a 17th-century mill on the "old road", before joining the River Rawthey near Sedbergh.  The Sedgwick Trail, named after the well-known geologist Adam Sedgwick runs along the Clough from Danny Bridge and highlights rock features along the Dent Fault.

History 
Historically, Garsdale was a chapelry in the ancient parish of Sedbergh in the Ewecross wapentake in the West Riding of Yorkshire. In 1866 it became a separate civil parish.  From 1894 to 1974 it was part of Sedbergh Rural District. In 1974 it became part of the new county of Cumbria.

Churches
There are also three Methodist chapels: Low Smithy and Garsdale Street, both in regular use, and Hawes Junction which has occasional special events.

Farming
Garsdale has numerous working farms, most of them amalgamating several of the original smallholdings. Pedigree Swaledale rams occasionally make high prices at Hawes Auction mart.

Ruswarp

At Garsdale railway station stands a statue of Ruswarp, a collie.  Ruswarp belonged to Graham Nuttall, the first Secretary of the Friends of the Settle–Carlisle Line, which was formed to campaign against the proposed closure of the line. Ruswarp's paw print was put on his own objection as a fare-paying passenger.  The line was finally saved in 1989.  In January 1990 Nuttall and Ruswarp went missing in the Welsh mountains.  On 7 April 1990 a lone walker found Nuttall's body, by a mountain stream. Nearby was Ruswarp, so weak that the 14-year-old dog had to be carried off the mountain. He had stayed with his master's body for 11 winter weeks.  The Royal Society for the Prevention of Cruelty to Animals awarded Ruswarp their Animal Medallion and collar for 'vigilance' and their Animal Plaque for 'intelligence and courage'.  He survived long enough to attend Nuttall's funeral. The statue by Joel Walker was unveiled in 2009.

Governance
Garsdale is part of the Westmorland and Lonsdale parliamentary constituency, of which Tim Farron is the current MP representing the Liberal Democrats.

For the European Parliament residents in Garsdale voted to elect MEP's for the North West England constituency.

For local government purposes it is in the Kirkby Lonsdale Ward of South Lakeland District Council and the Sedbergh + Kirkby Lonsdale Division of Cumbria County Council.

Garsdale has its own Parish Council; Garsdale Parish Council Council.

Notable people
Famous people born in Garsdale include:
 John Dawson (1734–1820), surgeon
 James Inman (1776–1859), astronomer
 John Haygarth (1740–1827), physician

See also

Listed buildings in Garsdale
Garsdale railway station

Bibliography
  Original copy available from Kendal public library.

References

External links
the Garsdale website
  Cumbria County History Trust: Garsdale (nb: provisional research only - see Talk page)
The Garsdale Red Squirrels website

Valleys of Cumbria
Civil parishes in Cumbria
South Lakeland District
Yorkshire Dales